Flashdance is a 1983 American romantic drama dance film directed by Adrian Lyne and starring Jennifer Beals as a passionate young dancer who aspires to become a professional ballerina (Alex), alongside Michael Nouri playing her boyfriend and the owner of the steel mill where she works by day in Pittsburgh. It was the first collaboration of producers Don Simpson and Jerry Bruckheimer, and the presentation of some sequences in the style of music videos was an influence on other 1980s films including Footloose, Purple Rain, and Top Gun, Simpson and Bruckheimer's most famous production. It was also one of Lyne's first major film releases, building on television commercials. Alex's elaborate dance sequences were shot using body doubles (Beals's main double was the uncredited French actress Marine Jahan, while a breakdance move was doubled by the male dancer Crazy Legs).

The film opened to negative reviews by professional critics, including Roger Ebert, who panned it as "great sound and flashdance, signifying nothing" (and eventually placed it on his "most hated" list). It was a surprise box-office success, becoming the third-highest-grossing film of 1983 in the United States. Its worldwide box-office gross exceeded $200 million. The soundtrack, compiled by Giorgio Moroder, spawned several hit songs, including "Maniac" (performed by Michael Sembello), and the Academy Award–winning "Flashdance... What a Feeling", which was written for the film by Moroder, with lyrics by Keith Forsey and the singer Irene Cara. Flashdance is also often remembered for its film poster featuring Beals sporting a sweatshirt with a large neck hole (according to the actress, her look in the scene came about by accident after she simply cut a large hole at the top of one that had shrunk in the wash).

Plot

Alexandra "Alex" Owens (Jennifer Beals) is an eighteen-year-old welder at a steel mill in Pittsburgh, Pennsylvania, who lives with her dog, Grunt, in a converted warehouse. She aspires to become a professional dancer, but has no formal dance training and works as a nightly cabaret performer at Mawby's, a neighborhood bar and grill.

Lacking family, Alex bonds with her coworkers at Mawby's, some of whom also aspire to greater artistic achievements. Jeanie (Sunny Johnson), a waitress, is training to be a figure skater, while her boyfriend, short-order cook Richie (Kyle T. Heffner), hopes to become a stand-up comic.

One night, Alex catches the eye of customer Nick Hurley (Michael Nouri), the owner of the steel mill where she works. After learning that Alex is one of his employees, Nick pursues her on the job, though Alex turns down his advances. Alex is also approached by Johnny C. (Lee Ving), who wants her to dance at his nearby strip club, Zanzibar.

After seeking counsel from her mentor, retired ballerina Hanna Long (Lilia Skala), Alex attempts to apply to the Pittsburgh Conservatory of Dance and Repertory. She becomes intimidated by the scope of the application process, which includes listing all prior dance experience and education, so she leaves without applying. Leaving Mawby's one evening, Richie and Alex are assaulted by Johnny C. and his bodyguard, Cecil. Nick intervenes, and after taking Alex home, the two begin a relationship.

In a skating competition, Jeanie falls twice during her performance and sits defeated on the ice before being helped away. Discouraged by her failure and the departure of Richie, who has decided to try his luck in Los Angeles, Jeanie begins dating Johnny C. and working as one of his strippers at Zanzibar. After finding out about Jeanie's situation from Jake, Alex finds her and drags her out of Zanzibar. Jeanie is angry, but she soon realizes her mistake.

After seeing Nick with a woman at the ballet one night, Alex throws a rock through a window of his house, only to discover that it was his ex-wife (Belinda Bauer), whom he was meeting for a charity function. Alex and Nick reconcile, and she gains the courage to apply to the Conservatory. Nick uses his connections with the arts council to get Alex an audition. Upon discovering this, Alex is furious with Nick because she did not get the opportunity based on merit, and she decides not to go through with the audition. Seeing the results of others' failed dreams and after the sudden death of Hanna, Alex becomes despondent about her future, but finally decides to go through with the audition.

At the audition, Alex falters, but begins again and successfully completes a dance number composed of moves that she has studied and practiced, including breakdancing which she has seen on the streets of Pittsburgh. The board responds favorably, and Alex is seen joyously emerging from the Conservatory to find Nick and Grunt waiting for her with a bouquet of roses.

Cast

Music

"Flashdance... What a Feeling" was performed by Irene Cara, who also sang the title song for the similar 1980 film Fame. The music for "Flashdance... What a Feeling" was composed by Giorgio Moroder, and the lyrics were written by Cara and Keith Forsey. The song won an Academy Award for Best Original Song, as well as a Golden Globe and numerous other awards. It also reached number one on the Billboard Hot 100 in May 1983. Despite the song's title, the word 'Flashdance' itself is not heard in the lyrics. The song is used in the opening title sequence of the film, and is the music Alex uses in her dance audition routine at the end of the film.

Another song used in the film, "Maniac", was also nominated for an Academy Award. It was written by Michael Sembello and Dennis Matkosky. A popular urban legend holds that the song was originally written for the 1980 horror film Maniac, and that lyrics about a killer on the loose were rewritten so the song could be used in Flashdance. The legend is discredited in the special features of the film's DVD release, which reveal that the song was written for the film, although only two complete lyrics ("Just a steel town girl on a Saturday night" and "She's a maniac") were available when filming commenced. Like the title song, it reached number one on the Billboard Hot 100 in September 1983.

Other songs in the film include "Lady, Lady, Lady", performed by Joe Esposito, "Gloria" and "Imagination" performed by Laura Branigan, and "I'll Be Here Where the Heart Is", performed by Kim Carnes.

The soundtrack album of Flashdance sold 700,000 copies during its first two weeks on sale and has gone on to sell over six million copies in the U.S. alone. In 1984, the album won the Grammy Award for Best Album of Original Score Written for a Motion Picture or a Television Special.

Production
In April 1980, Thomas Hedley sold the film idea for development to Casablanca, a Los Angeles production company, for $300,000 and 5% of the net, as reported in The Globe and Mail, and later sold to Paramount Pictures.

Adrian Lyne was not the first choice as director of Flashdance. David Cronenberg had turned down an offer to direct the film, as had Brian De Palma, who instead chose to direct Scarface (1983). At the time, Lyne's background was primarily in directing television commercials, such as his 1970s UK commercials for Brutus Jeans (which may conceivably be seen as anticipating the visuals and style of Flashdance). Executives at Paramount were unsure about the film's potential and sold 25% of the rights prior to its release. The film was shot between October 18, 1982 and December 30, 1982.

Flashdance is often remembered for the sweatshirt with a large neck hole that Beals wore on the poster advertising the film. Beals said that the look of the sweatshirt came about by accident when it shrank in the wash and she cut out a large hole at the top so that she could wear it again.

Casting
Three candidates, Jennifer Beals, Demi Moore, and Leslie Wing, were the finalists for the role of Alex Owens. Two different stories exist regarding how Beals was chosen. One states that then-Paramount president Michael Eisner asked women secretaries at the studio to select their favorite after viewing screen tests. The other: the film's scriptwriter Joe Eszterhas claims that Eisner asked "two hundred of the most macho men on the [Paramount] lot, Teamsters and gaffers and grips ... 'I want to know which of these three young women you'd most want to fuck'".

The role of Nick Hurley was originally offered to Kiss founding member Gene Simmons, who turned it down because it would conflict with his "demon" image. Pierce Brosnan, Robert De Niro, Richard Gere, Mel Gibson, Tom Hanks, and John Travolta were also considered for the part. Kevin Costner, a struggling actor at the time, came very close for the role of Nick Hurley, which went to Michael Nouri.

Crew
Flashdance was the first success of a number of filmmakers who became successful in the 1980s and beyond. The film was the first collaboration between Don Simpson and Jerry Bruckheimer, who went on to produce Beverly Hills Cop (1984) and Top Gun (1986). Eszterhas received his second screen credit for Flashdance, while Lyne went on to direct 9½ Weeks (1986), Fatal Attraction (1987), Indecent Proposal (1993), and Lolita (1997). Lynda Obst, who developed the original story outline, went on to produce Adventures in Babysitting (1987), The Fisher King (1991), and Sleepless in Seattle (1993).

Filming

The dimly lit cinematography and montage-style editing are due in part to the fact that most of Jennifer Beals' dancing in the film was performed by a body double. Her main dance double is the French actress Marine Jahan, while the breakdancing that Alex performs in the audition sequence at the end of the film was doubled by the male dancer Crazy Legs. The shot of Alex diving through the air in slow motion during the audition sequence was performed by Sharon Shapiro, who was a professional gymnast. The producers of the film stated they had made no secret of having used a double for Beals, and that Jahan's name did not appear because Paramount Pictures shortened the closing credits. Marine Jahan was told that her involvement was hidden because "they didn't want to break the magic of the film".

Locations

Much of the film was shot in locations around Pittsburgh, Pennsylvania:
 The ice skating rink scene on which Jeanie falls was filmed at Culver Ice Rink in Culver City, California.
 The fictional Pittsburgh Conservatory of Dance and Repertory was filmed inside the lobby and in front of Carnegie Music Hall, a part of the Carnegie Museum of Art, located near the campuses of Carnegie Mellon University and the University of Pittsburgh in the Oakland neighborhood of Pittsburgh.
 Alex's apartment was located in the South Side neighborhood of Pittsburgh. The interior of the apartment was filmed in Los Angeles at what was the Feit Electric Building on Los Angeles Street in downtown LA. 
 Alex is seen riding one of the Duquesne Incline cable cars when she goes to visit Hannah.
 Hannah's apartment is located at 2100 Sidney Street at the southeast corner of South 21st Street. The entrance to the apartment is from South 21st Street.
 The opening sequence of scenes with Alex riding her bicycle starts in the Fineview neighborhood of Pittsburgh, at the intersection of Catoma Street and Warren Street. She rides south on Warren Street to Henderson Street, makes a hairpin turn from Henderson Street onto Fountain Street, and is next shown riding south on Middle Street. The last scene of the sequence shows Alex riding east over the Smithfield Street Bridge, which is a continuity error.

Release
Flashdance was released in the United States on April 15, 1983. On April 14, 1983, the night before the general release of the film, a special benefit premiere of Flashdance was shown at the Warner Theater in Pittsburgh. It was the last film at the theater. Several months later it was torn down to make way for The Warner Centre, a retail and office complex.

Home media
Flashdance has been issued originally on VHS and Laserdisc with a Paramount Pictures DVD release on October 8, 2002 and a Special Collector’s Edition DVD in 2010.
It was first released on Blu-ray Disc on August 13, 2013 by Warner Bros. with seven special features including a 15-minute featurette, "The History of Flashdance", a 9-minute featurette, "The Look of Flashdance", "Flashdance: The Choreography" and a teaser and theatrical trailers.
The film was re-released on Blu-ray in the U.S. on May 19, 2020 by Paramount Presents with a new 4K remaster and packaging. It includes a new Filmmakers Focus interview with the director but excludes a few special features from the previous Blu-ray release.

Reception

Critical response
On Rotten Tomatoes the film has an approval rating of 35% based on 48 reviews. The site's consensus is: "All style and very little substance, Flashdance boasts eye-catching dance sequences—and benefits from an appealing performance from Jennifer Beals—but its narrative is flat-footed". On Metacritic the film has a score of 39% based on reviews from 11 critics, indicating "generally unfavorable reviews".

Roger Ebert placed it on his list of Most Hated films, and in giving the film 1.5 out of 4 stars in his review, stated: "Jennifer Beals shouldn't feel bad. She is a natural talent, she is fresh and engaging here, and only needs to find an agent with a natural talent for turning down scripts". In his review for the Chicago Sun-Times, Ebert said "If Flashdance had spent just a little more effort getting to know the heroine of its story, and a little less time trying to rip off Saturday Night Fever, it might have been a much better film." Variety compared the film to a series of music videos, "Watching Flashdance is pretty much like looking at MTV for 96 minutes. Virtually plotless, exceedingly thin on characterization and sociologically laughable, pic at least lives up to its title by offering an anthology of extraordinarily flashy dance numbers." Janet Maslin of The New York Times wrote: "With a score by Giorgio Moroder, and with ingenious costumes that are utterly au courant, Flashdance contains such dynamic dance scenes that it's a pity there's a story here to bog them down."

In a 1984 essay for the journal Jump Cut, critic Kathryn Kalinak questioned the characterization of Alex: "How could an 18 year-old woman land a skilled labor job as a welder in the unionized steel industry of an economically depressed union town? . . . Not only are any other women missing in the factory, so are employees, male or female, under 30."

Accolades

The film is recognized by American Film Institute in these lists:
 2004: AFI's 100 Years...100 Songs:
 "Flashdance... What a Feeling" – #55
 2006: AFI's 100 Years...100 Cheers – Nominated

Legacy

There were discussions about a sequel, but the film was never made. Beals turned down an offer to appear in a sequel, saying: "I've never been drawn to something by virtue of how rich or famous it will make me. I turned down so much money, and my agents were just losing their minds."

In March 2001, a Broadway musical version was proposed with new songs by Giorgio Moroder, but failed to materialize. In July 2008, a stage musical adaptation Flashdance The Musical premiered at the Theatre Royal in Plymouth, England. The book is co-written by Tom Hedley, who created the story outline for the original film, and the choreography is by Arlene Phillips.

In October 2020, Paramount announced plans to reboot the film as a TV series for its Paramount+ (formerly known as CBS All Access) streaming service.

Jennifer Beals' performance started her reputation as a lesbian icon.

Connection to MTV
Flashdance is not a musical in the traditional sense as the characters do not sing, but rather the songs are presented in the style of self-contained music videos. Its success has been attributed in part to the 1981 launch of the cable channel MTV (Music Television) since it was the first feature film to exploit the new popularity of music videos effectively. By excerpting segments of the film and running them as music videos on MTV, the studio benefited from extensive free promotion, establishing the new medium as an important marketing tool for films. In the mid-1980s, it became almost obligatory to release a music video to promote a major motion picture—even if the film was not especially suited for one.

Legal action

Suit against the filmmakers
Flashdance was inspired by the real-life story of Maureen Marder, a construction worker/welder by day and dancer by night at Gimlets, a Toronto strip club. Like Alex Owens in the film, she aspired to enroll in a prestigious dance school. Tom Hedley wrote the original story outline for Flashdance, and on December 6, 1982, Marder signed a release document giving Paramount Pictures the right to portray her life story on screen, for which she was given a one-off payment of $2,300. Flashdance is estimated to have grossed more than $200 million worldwide. In June 2006, the U.S. Court of Appeals for the Ninth Circuit in San Francisco affirmed a lower court's ruling that Marder gave up her rights to the film when she signed the release document in 1982. The panel of three judges stated in its ruling: "Though in hindsight the agreement appears to be unfair to Marder—she only received $2,300 in exchange for a release of all claims relating to a movie that grossed over $150 million—there is simply no evidence that her consent was obtained by fraud, deception, misrepresentation, duress or undue influence." The court also noted that Marder's attorney had been present when she signed the document.

Suit against Jennifer Lopez and filmmakers over music video
In 2003, following the use of dance routines from the film by Jennifer Lopez in her music video "I'm Glad" (directed by David LaChapelle), Marder sued Lopez, Sony Corporation (the makers of the music video), and Paramount in an attempt to gain a copyright interest in the film. Although Lopez argued that her video for "I'm Glad" was intended as a tribute to Flashdance, in May 2003 Sony agreed to pay a licensing fee to Paramount for the use of dance routines and other story material from the film in the video.

See also
 It's Flashbeagle, Charlie Brown
 List of American films of 1983
 Duquesne Brewery Clock
 Dance, Girl, Dance

References

External links
 
 
 

1983 films
1980s dance films
1983 romantic drama films
American dance films
American romantic drama films
1980s English-language films
Fictional portrayals of the Pittsburgh Bureau of Police
Films about interclass romance
Films adapted into plays
Films directed by Adrian Lyne
Films produced by Don Simpson
Films produced by Jerry Bruckheimer
Films scored by Giorgio Moroder
Films set in Pittsburgh
Films set in Pennsylvania
Films shot in Pittsburgh
Films that won the Best Original Song Academy Award
Films with screenplays by Joe Eszterhas
Paramount Pictures films
PolyGram Filmed Entertainment films
Films about striptease
Breakdancing films
1980s American films